Bruno Racine (born 17 December 1951 in Paris) is a French civil servant and writer.

Early life and education

Racine is the son of Pierre Racine (a conseiller d'État) and Edwina Morgulis, Bruno Racine was born in Paris. He studied at the École La Rochefoucauld then at the lycée Louis-le-Grand before entering the École Normale Supérieure in 1971 and obtaining an agrégation in "lettres classiques". He also followed courses at the Institut d'études politiques de Paris and entered the École nationale d'administration in 1977.

Career
Racine left the ENA for the Cour des Comptes where he was named auditor in 1979 then "conseiller référendaire" in 1983. On 5 September 1981, he married Béatrice de Bégon de Larouzière-Montlosier, and they have had 4 children.

Racine entered the service for strategic affairs and disarmament in the Ministry of Foreign Relations (1983–1986) before joining the cabinet of Jacques Chirac, Prime Minister as a 'chargé de mission' (1986–1988).

In 1988, he was named director of cultural affairs for the city of Paris, occupying that post until 1993, when he joined the cabinet of Alain Juppé, again as "chargé de mission auprès du ministre", and at the same time director of the Centre d'analyse et de prévision (1993–1995). He then followed him to Matignon as "chargé de mission auprès du Premier ministre", with particular concern for the cultural and strategic portfolios (1995–1997).

Promoted to conseiller maître à la Cour des comptes (1996), Racine became director of the French Academy in Rome (1997–2002) before being named president of the Centre Georges-Pompidou (2002).

In March 2007, Racine was made president of the Bibliothèque nationale de France, to take effect on 2 April 2007, succeeding Jean-Noël Jeanneney, who had reached the age limit for that post.

Following the declaration in January 2009 by Minister of Culture, Christine Albanel that the archives of Guy Debord constituted a national treasure, Racine was tasked with ensuring the necessary funds – amounting to several hundred thousand euros – for the BNF to purchase them from Alice Becker-Ho, Debord's widow.

Following his departure in 2016, Racine was succeeded as president of the Bibliothèque nationale de France by Laurence Engel, who took up the post on the 11 April 2016,

Other activities
 Fondation pour la recherche stratégique (FRS), Member of the Board of Directors (since 2001) 
 Haut conseil de l’éducation, Member (since 2005)

Works
 Le Gouverneur de Morée, 1982, Prix du Premier Roman
 Terre de promission, 1986
 Au péril de la mer, 1991, Prix des Deux Magots 1992
 La Séparation des biens, 1999, Prix La Bruyère from the Académie française 1999
 L'Art de vivre à Rome (collaboration), 1999, Grand prix du livre des arts from the Société des gens de lettres 2000
 L'Art de vivre en Toscane, 2000
 Le tombeau de la Chrétienne, 2002
 Le côté d'Odessa, 2007
 Google et le nouveau monde, 2010
 Adieu à l'Italie, 2012

Honours
Knight of the Légion d'honneur

References

 Who's Who in France, 34e édition, 2002–2003, Levallois-Perret, Éditions Jacques Lafitte, 2002, p. 1566

1951 births
Living people
Writers from Paris
French civil servants
Lycée Louis-le-Grand alumni
École Normale Supérieure alumni
Sciences Po alumni
École nationale d'administration alumni
Prix des Deux Magots winners
Prix du premier roman winners
French male writers
Officiers of the Légion d'honneur
Commandeurs of the Ordre des Arts et des Lettres